Switzerland competed at the 1960 Summer Olympics in Rome, Italy. 149 competitors, 147 men and 2 women, took part in 90 events in 16 sports.

Medalists

Silver
 Gustav Fischer — Equestrian, Dressage Individual Competition
 Anton Bühler, Rudolf Günthardt and Hans Schwarzenbach — Equestrian, Three-Day Event Team Competition
 Hans Rudolf Spillmann — Shooting, Men's Free Rifle, Three Positions

Bronze
 Anton Bühler — Equestrian, Three-Day Event Individual Competition
 Ernst Hürlimann and Rolf Larcher — Rowing, Men's Double Sculls 
 Henri Copponex, Pierre Girard and Manfred Metzger — Sailing, 5.5 Metre

Athletics

Boxing

Canoeing

Cycling

14 male cyclists represented Switzerland in 1960.

Individual road race
 Erwin Jaisli
 Emil Beeler
 Max Wechsler
 Hubert Bächli

Team time trial
 Erwin Jaisli
 Roland Zöffel
 René Rutschmann
 Hubert Bächli

Sprint
 Kurt Rechsteiner

1000m time trial
 Josef Helbling

Tandem
 Peter Vogel
 Peter Hirzel

Team pursuit
 Walter Signer
 Werner Weckert
 Hans Heinemann
 Egon Scheiwiller

Diving

Equestrian

Fencing

Seven fencers, all men, represented Switzerland in 1960.

Men's foil
 Jean Cerrottini
 Michel Steininger
 Claudio Polledri

Men's épée
 Jules Amez-Droz
 Claudio Polledri
 Michel Steininger

Men's team épée
 Hans Bässler, Jules Amez-Droz, Paul Meister, Charles Ribordy, Claudio Polledri, Michel Steininger

Gymnastics

Hockey

Modern pentathlon

Three male pentathletes represented Switzerland in 1960.

Individual
 Erhard Minder
 Werner Vetterli
 Rolf Weber

Team
 Erhard Minder
 Werner Vetterli
 Rolf Weber

Rowing

Men's single sculls
 Hugo Waser

Men's double sculls
 Ernst Hürlimann
 Rolf Larcher

Men's coxless pair
 Walter Knabenhans
 Heinrich Scherer

Men's coxless four
 Paul Kölliker
 Göpf Kottmann
 Kurt Schmid
 Rolf Streuli

Men's eight
 Rico Bianchi
 Émile Ess
 Hugo Goeggel
 Hans Graber
 Werner Kölliker
 Walter Osterwalder
 Gottfried Schär
 Hansruedi Scheller
 Werner Ehrensperger

Sailing

Shooting

Ten shooters represented Switzerland in 1960.

25 m pistol
 Hansruedi Schneider
 Hans Albrecht

50 m pistol
 Albert Späni
 Frédéric Michel

300 m rifle, three positions
 Hans Rudolf Spillmann
 August Hollenstein

50 m rifle, three positions
 Kurt Müller
 Hans Schönenberger

50 m rifle, prone
 Hans Rudolf Spillmann
 Hans Schönenberger

Trap
 Pierre-André Flückiger
 Louis von Sonnenberg

Swimming

Weightlifting

Wrestling

References

Nations at the 1960 Summer Olympics
1960
1960 in Swiss sport